William Long LL.B. (d. 16 July 1835) was a Canon of Windsor from 1804 to 1835.

Family
He was the fifth son of Beeston Long and Sarah Cropp. His brother was Charles Long, 1st Baron Farnborough.

Career
He was educated at Emmanuel College, Cambridge.

He was appointed:
Rector of Sternfield, Suffolk 1788
Rector of Dennington, Suffolk 1788 - 1808
Rector of Pulham, Norfolk 1808

He was appointed to the tenth stall in St George's Chapel, Windsor Castle in 1804 and held the canonry until his death.

Further reading 
Inheriting the Earth: The Long Family's 500 Year Reign in Wiltshire; Cheryl Nicol

Notes 

1835 deaths
Canons of Windsor
Alumni of Emmanuel College, Cambridge
Year of birth missing